East Winch is a village and civil parish in the English county of Norfolk.

History
East Winch's name is of Anglo-Saxon origin and derives from the Old English for the eastern part of a settlement or farmstead based on a pasture.

In the Domesday Book, East Winch is listed as a settlement of 51 households in the hundred of Freebridge. In 1086, the village formed part of the East Anglian estates of King William I, Roger Bigod, Ralph de Tosny, Hermer de Ferrers and a freeman by the name of Rainer.

Crancourt Manor was a Medieval residence of the Howard family, built as a fortified manor house. By the mid-Nineteenth Century, the manor was ruined apart from a single chimney stack which remains the case today.

In May 1944, a de Havilland Mosquito of No. 23 Squadron RAF crashed within the parish after technical difficulties on a test flight from RAF Little Snoring. Pilots F/O Charles J. Preece (RCAF) and F/O Frederick H. Ruffle DFC (RAF) were killed in the crash.

Geography
According to the 2011 Census, East Winch has a population of 779 residents living in 350 households.

East Winch falls within the constituency of North West Norfolk and is represented at Parliament by James Wild MP of the Conservative Party. For the purposes of local government, the parish falls within the district of King's Lynn and West Norfolk.

All Saints' Church
East Winch's parish church was built in the Perpendicular style in the late-Fourteenth Century under the leadership of the Howard family, by the Eighteenth Century the church had largely fallen into disrepair until it was repaired under the oversight of George Gilbert Scott. All Saints' features good examples of Nineteenth Century stained glass installed by Clayton and Bell depicting Christ as a shepherd and the Parable of the Good Samaritan, with a further depiction of the Resurrection by Ward and Hughes.

Amenities
East Winch airfield was founded in 1986 by Colin and Peter Burman, initially for crop dusting. However, after this was banned in 2009 by the European Union, the airfield has been dedicated to leisure.

Transport
East Winch railway station opened in 1846 as a stop on the Lynn and Dereham Railway between King's Lynn and Dereham. The station closed in 1968.

Notable Residents
 Sir William Howard (1225-1308)- English lawyer and justice
 Sir John Howard (c.1366-1437)- English landowner, soldier and courtier
 Sir Osbert Lancaster (1908-1986)- English cartoonist, historian and author

War Memorial
East Winch's war memorial takes the form of an inscribed marble Roll of Honour, located in All Saints' Church. The memorial lists the following names as fallen during the First World War:
 Stoker-First-Class Robert B. Weston (1895-1916), HMS Queen Mary
 Private Albert E. Reeve (1895-1916), 7th Battalion, Bedfordshire Regiment
 Private Albert Berry (1886-1915), 1st Battalion, Essex Regiment
 Private Bert T. Edwards (d.1917), 1st Battalion, Essex Regiment
 Private James T. Reeve (1896-1916), 8th Battalion, Royal Norfolk Regiment
 Private William J. Brown (1895-1918), 9th Battalion, Royal Norfolk Regiment

References

External links

Villages in Norfolk
King's Lynn and West Norfolk
Civil parishes in Norfolk